Students for Fair Admissions, Inc. v. President and Fellows of Harvard College (Docket 20–1199) and Students for Fair Admissions, Inc. v. University of North Carolina (Docket 21-707) are a pair of lawsuits concerning racial discrimination in affirmative action programs in college admissions processes. The first case involves Harvard University's undergraduate admissions process which is claimed to discriminate against Asian American applicants, while the second centers on the University of North Carolina's use of socioeconomic factors in administration, which is claimed to incorporate race and violate Title VI of the Civil Rights Act of 1964. Both cases seek review of the Supreme Court decision Grutter v. Bollinger (2003) which validated the use of affirmative action programs in college admissions as long as race is not used as the sole deciding factor. 

The cases were originally certified and consolidated under the Harvard case in January 2022, but following the appointment of Justice Ketanji Brown Jackson (who was a member of the Harvard Board of Overseers until 2022), the cases were split with Jackson recusing from the Harvard case while participating in the North Carolina one.

Background

Harvard College
Harvard is a private university, but it receives federal funding, making it subject to Title VI of the Civil Rights Act of 1964, which outlaws racial discrimination. Race-conscious admissions policies are legal, under case law, so long as they pass the "strict scrutiny" standard, which requires that the use of race serve a "compelling governmental interest"—like the educational benefits that stem from diversity—and be "narrowly tailored" to satisfy that interest. 

Since the Supreme Court's ruling in Regents of the University of California v. Bakke (1978), racial quotas have been banned in university admissions. A "whole person review" process that considers many qualities about each candidate, including race, in its admissions process, however, is legal under Supreme Court's ruling in both Grutter v. Bollinger (2003) and Fisher v. University of Texas (2016, known as Fisher II) and its predecessors. In Fisher v. University of Texas (2013), the Supreme Court additionally held that colleges must prove that race-conscious admissions policies are the only way to meet diversity goals.

Lawsuit 
Students for Fair Admissions (SFFA) filed a lawsuit in federal district court against Harvard University on November 17, 2014, representing a group of anonymous Asian American plaintiffs rejected from Harvard. SFFA was founded by conservative legal strategist Edward Blum, who also founded the Project on Fair Representation, with a goal to end racial classifications in education, voting procedures, legislative redistricting, and employment. Blum participated in cases such as Bush v. Vera, Shelby County v. Holder, and Fisher v. University of Texas. The SFFA case is the first high-profile case on behalf of plaintiffs who were not white, and who had academic credentials that were "much harder to criticize." The lawyers for SFFA stated that the initial hearing focused on the issue of discrimination against Asian American applicants, instead of trying to challenge affirmative action in general. 

Certain Asian American advocacy groups filed amicus briefs in support of SFFA, believing that they or their children are discriminated against in college admission processes. Other Asian American advocacy groups filed amicus briefs in support of Harvard.

Plaintiff allegations 
In the lawsuit, the plaintiffs claimed that Harvard imposes a soft racial quota, which keeps the numbers of Asian Americans artificially low. The percentage of Asians admitted to Harvard, plaintiffs maintained, was suspiciously similar year after year despite dramatic increases in the number of Asian American applicants, as well as the size of the Asian American population.

During the lawsuit, the plaintiffs gained access to Harvard's individualized admissions files from 2014 to 2019 and aggregate data from 2000 to 2019. The plaintiffs also interviewed and deposed numerous Harvard officials. From these sources, the plaintiffs alleged that Harvard admissions officers consistently rated Asian American applicants as a group lower than others on traits like positive personality, likability, courage, kindness and being widely respected. The plaintiffs alleged that Asian Americans scored higher than applicants of any other racial or ethnic group on other admissions measures like test scores, grades and extracurricular activities, but the students' personal ratings significantly dragged down their admissions chances. The plaintiffs also claimed that alumni interviewers (who, unlike admissions officers within Harvard, did actually meet with individual applicants) gave Asian Americans personal ratings comparable to white applicants. Harvard's admissions staff testified that they did not believe that different racial groups have better personal qualities than others but nevertheless Asian applicants as a racial group received consistently weaker personal scores over the period surveyed and Harvard's admissions office rated Asian Americans with the worst personal qualities of any racial group. African-Americans, on the other hand, consistently scored the lowest on the academic rating but highest on the personal rating.

Peter Arcidiacono, a Duke University economist testifying on behalf of the plaintiffs, concluded that Asian American applicants as a group performed stronger on measures of academic achievement (which Arcidiacono measures using applicants' SAT and ACT scores) and extracurricular activities. Despite this, they received a statistically significant penalty relative to white applicants in the "Personal Rating" and "Overall Rating" assigned by Harvard officials. As a result, the plaintiffs allege Asian American applicants have the lowest chance of admission of all racial groups in the United States despite scoring highest in all objective measurements. Arcidiacono testified that removing the personal score penalty of Asian applicants relative to white applicants would result in a 16% increase in the number of admitted Asian Americans.

Arcidiacono suggested that the applicant's race plays a significant role in admissions decisions. According to his testimony, if an Asian American applicant with certain characteristics (like scores, GPAs, and extracurricular activities, family background) would result in a 25% statistical likelihood of admission, the same applicant, if white, will have a 36% likelihood of admission. Hispanic and Black applicants with the same characteristics will have a 77% and 95% predicted chance of admission, respectively. 

Arcidiacono's report also alleges that Harvard’s preferential treatment of African-American and Hispanic applicants is not the result of the university's efforts to achieve socioeconomic diversity of its student body, as "Harvard admits more than twice as many non-disadvantaged African-American applicants than disadvantaged African-American applicants." He also stated that if Harvard were to remove all other factors for admissions preference— racial preferences for under-represented minorities, penalties against Asian Americans, and legacy and athlete preferences— the number of Asian-American admits would increase by 1,241 over six years, a 50% increase.

The plaintiffs also claim that Harvard's own Office of Institutional Research found a statistically significant penalty against Asian American applicants in an internal investigation in 2013, but had never made the findings public or acted on them. Plaintiffs and commentators have compared the current treatment of Asians with the Jewish quota in place in the early 20th century, which used the allegedly “deficient” one-dimensional personalities of immigrant Jews and their alleged lack of leadership traits as the reason for excluding non-legacy Jews in elite universities, including Harvard.

Defendant responses 
Harvard denies engaging in discrimination and said its admissions philosophy of considering race as one of many factors in its admissions policy complies with the law. The school also says that it receives more than 40,000 applications, that a large majority of applicants are academically qualified, and as a result it must consider more than grades and test scores to determine admission for its 2,000 available slots. Harvard also claims that its personal rating "reflects a wide range of valuable information in the application, such as an applicant’s personal essays, responses to short answer questions, recommendations from teachers and guidance counselors, alumni interview reports, staff interviews, and any additional letters or information provided by the applicant."

The school also said the percentage of Asian American students admitted has grown from 17% to 21% in a decade while Asian Americans represent around 6% of the U.S. population. Harvard further claimed that it had studied more than a dozen race-neutral admissions alternatives and allegedly found none "promote Harvard’s diversity-related educational objectives as well as Harvard’s … admissions program while also maintaining the standards of excellence that Harvard seeks in its student body.”

Using the same data given to the plaintiffs, UC Berkeley economist David Card testified on behalf of Harvard and claimed in a report that SFFA's analysis of the personal ratings excluded applications from a sizable percentage of the applicant pool, personal essays, and letters of recommendation from teachers and guidance counselors and that there was no statistically significant difference in personal scores compared to white students. Furthermore, Card claimed that if SFFA's analysis showed that the personal ratings assigned to Asian Americans were unexpectedly poorer, Asian Americans also unexpectedly scored higher on the academic rating than other racial groups, which would add complexity to the claim that Harvard is intentionally discriminating against Asian Americans.

Harvard also argued that the Office of Institutional Research documents that the plaintiffs alleged were proof of discrimination against Asian Americans represented "a preliminary and incomplete analysis OIR was conducting without the benefit of the full admissions database or a full understanding of the admissions process" and that "[the] OIR documents themselves directly acknowledge various missing data and aspects of the admissions process that are not taken into account." 

Various students, alumni and external groups filed amici briefs on both sides.

Lower courts 
The case was paused until the Supreme Court issued its decision in Fisher II on June 23, 2016. The case resumed, and a three-week bench trial was held in Massachusetts federal district court in Boston in October 2018.

In October 2019, Judge Allison D. Burroughs ruled that Harvard College's admissions policies do not unduly discriminate against Asian Americans. While the system is "not perfect", Burroughs ruled, it nonetheless passes constitutional muster. In her ruling, Burroughs states that there were "no quotas" in place at Harvard, despite acknowledging that the school attempts to reach the same level of racial diversity each year and "uses the racial makeup of admitted students to help determine how many students it should admit overall."

In February 2020, SFFA filed an appeal in the United States Court of Appeals for the First Circuit. The court heard oral arguments in mid-2020 and ultimately ruled in late 2020 in favor of Harvard, concluding that Judge Burroughs had not erred in her ruling and major factual findings. The Justice Department filed friend-of-the-court briefs in both the initial hearing and the appeal, arguing that Harvard imposes "a racial penalty by systematically disfavoring Asian American applicants".

University of North Carolina
The University of North Carolina (UNC), as a publicly-funded school, is required to follow Title VI of the Civil Rights Act, which disallows publicly-funded schools to discriminate against students within its admission processes. UNC used an approach of actively recruiting low-income and first-generation students after it determined this was the only way they could encourage a racially-diverse body. SFFA, in the wake of its ongoing lawsuit with Harvard, filed a lawsuit against UNC claiming this practice violated Title VI and the Fourteenth Amendment. The district court rejected SFFA's challenge; as the SFFA had already petitioned to the Supreme Court on its Harvard appeal, the group preemptively filed a similar request for review of the UNC case to the Supreme Court.

Supreme Court
SFFA petitioned the Supreme Court to review both the First Circuit's decision in the Harvard case, which focused on the impact of the admissions process on Asian Americans, and a similar decision from the Middle District of North Carolina, Students for Fair Admissions v. University of NC, et al., which focused on the impact on both Caucasian and Asian American applicants at the University of North Carolina and which had been decided in the school's favor in October 2021. Both petitions sought the court to overturn Grutter v. Bollinger. In Harvard, SFFA asked if Harvard's admission practices were in violation of Title VI of the Civil Rights Act given possible race-neutral selection processes, while in North Carolina, they asked if a university can reject a race-neutral admission process if they believe they need to protect the diversity of the student body and quality of education. 

Harvard filed an opposing brief seeking to have SFFA's petition rejected by the Supreme Court. In June of 2021 the Court requested that the U.S. government submit a brief of its stance on the case and in December the Solicitor General of the United States under the Biden administration urged the Supreme Court to reject the appeal.

The Supreme Court certified both petitions on January 24, 2022, and consolidated them under Harvard. After Ketanji Brown Jackson testified during her confirmation hearing that she would recuse herself from the case because she is on the Harvard Board of Overseers, the Supreme Court separated the two cases, allowing her to participate in the UNC case. Both cases were argued on October 31, 2022.

Amicus briefs
The Court received thirty-three amicus briefs in support of SFFA, and sixty in support of Harvard and UNC.

Among those in support of SFFA, fourteen senators and 68 representives as well as 19 states wrote that Grutter was inconsistent with the Equal Protection Clause. Others wrote that the admission policies at Harvard and the University of North Carolina were discriminatory, in that any favoritism towards one race results in discrimination towards others. Other arguments in the SFFA-supporting briefs including those from Cato Institute and the Pacific Legal Foundation considered that affirmative action policies are generally arbitrary, do not enhance diversity on campuses, and also violate the allowance for federal funding under Title VI.

In support of the universities, both the Biden administration and several current and former senators wrote that historically, both the legislative and executive branches have worked to combat racial imbalances through affirmation action and are not intended to violate Title VI. Sixty-five senators and representatives states that despite both Brown and Grutter, segregation at K-12 schools continues to worsen, and affirmative action policies are needed to fight racial imbalance. Several groups, including the American Bar Association, the American Psychological Association, and the American Civil Liberties Union, wrote to support that racial diversity is essential to college and beyond.

A number of other Asian American groups have submitted amicus briefs in support of race-conscious admissions policies and Harvard. They include the Asian American Legal Defense and Education Fund, representing itself and 44 other Asian American groups and higher education faculty, and Asian Americans Advancing Justice - Los Angeles, representing several Asian American students.  The NAACP Legal Defense and Education Fund filed a brief in support of Harvard representing 25 Harvard student and alumni organizations consisting of "thousands of Asian American, Black, Latino, Native American, and white students and alumni." One legal publication subsequently argued that Harvard’s admissions procedures “disadvantage the very African American and Hispanic students best positioned to bring instructive and underrepresented perspectives to the college”.

Reactions 

On May 15, 2015, a coalition of more than 60 Asian American organizations filed federal complaints with the United States Department of Education and Department of Justice against Harvard University. The coalition asked for a civil rights investigation into what it described as Harvard's discriminatory admission practices against Asian American applicants. The complaints at the Department of Education were dismissed in July 2015 because a lawsuit making similar allegations had already been filed by Students for Fair Admissions (SFFA) in November 2014. 

However, in 2017, the coalition resubmitted their complaints to the Department of Justice under the Trump administration. It opened an investigation into allegations against Harvard's policies, and that investigation was ongoing as of February 2020.

See also 
 Ryan Y. Park
 Affirmative action in the United States

References

Further reading

External links 
 Harvard's Website Regarding The Case
 SFFA Lawsuit Updates
 Case Profile: Students for Fair Admissions v. Harvard

2023 in United States case law
United States Supreme Court cases
United States Supreme Court cases of the Roberts Court
United States affirmative action case law
United States equal protection case law
United States racial discrimination case law
Asian-American society
Harvard University
Politics and race in the United States
Race and education in the United States
University and college admissions in the United States